Taishang are Taiwanese businesspeople who do business in mainland China. The term literally translates into English as "Taiwan Business." There are no official statistics on the number of Taishang working in mainland China. Unofficial estimates circulating in 2011 suggested that between 1 million and 3 million Republic of China nationals (including family members) lived in mainland China.

Economic impact

The more Taiwanese capital is invested in the mainland, the more it becomes part and parcel of China's growing economy. Therefore, the taishang are a major force in the economic integration of China with the larger world-economy.

After the economic reform escalated, China has attracted a huge amount of direct investments from Taiwan and concomitantly a large number of Taiwanese entrepreneurs, managers, and professionals moved to China. China has replaced the US as Taiwan's top importer in 2003.

The change of government in Taiwan in May 2008 and the economic crisis that took hold of coastal China in late 2008 and continued throughout 2009, forced many factories in Taiwan to close down or relocate to other countries. This led to a large increase in the number of taishang in Mainland China.

As of the end of 2008, China's Ministry of Commerce (MOC) reported Taiwanese direct investment (TDI) in China to be US$47.7 billion; Taiwan's Ministry of Economic Affairs (MOEA) Investment Commission (hereafter, Investment Commission) announced a total investment value of US$75.6 billion; Taiwan's Mainland Affairs Council (MAC) estimated the amount at between US$100 billion and US$150 billion; many private sectors in Taiwan estimated the amount to be between US$100 billion and US$200 billion.

Political impact

Collectively the taishang are seen as an important group in Taiwanese politics and are widely perceived to be supportive of deeper economic integration between Taiwan and mainland China. Taishang as a group are widely assumed to support Taiwan's pro-Chinese-Nationalist KMT party. The Taishang organization,  (ATIEM), organizes flights to Taiwan for Taishang to vote in Taiwanese elections. In reality, research shows that most Taishang are not very interested in Chinese media journalism or television programmes. This is because the perception of being superior to the PRC Chinese discourages them from becoming involved in Chinese society and politics.

References

Cross-Strait relations
Politics of Taiwan